A Walk with Love and Death is a 1969 American historical-drama film directed by John Huston and starring Anjelica Huston and Assi Dayan.

Plot
The story is based on the 1961 novel by Hans Koningsberger, set at the time of the 1358 uprising of the peasants of northern France known as the Jacquerie. Heron of Fois (Assi Dayan), a student from Paris, crosses territory devastated by the upheaval and the ferocious reprisals of the nobility. He meets with Claudia (Anjelica Huston), the aristocratic daughter of a royal official killed by the peasants, and they attempt to reach Calais. In the novel, Heron's intended final destination is Oxford University while in the film "the sea" less specifically comes to represent an abstract freedom. While differing in their views of the Jacquerie—Heron sympathises with the exploited peasantry, and Claudia sees their rising as mindless savagery—the young couple become lovers. In the end, they fail to escape the chaotic violence around them but await death "strangely happy - we had stopped running from them and we had our hour".

Cast
 Anjelica Huston as Claudia
 Assi Dayan as Heron of Fois (as Assaf dayan)
 Anthony Higgins as Robert of Loris (as Anthony Corlan)
 John Hallam as Sir Meles
 Robert Lang as Pilgrim Leader
 Guy Deghy as The Priest
 Michael Gough as Mad Monk
 George Murcell as The Captain
 Eileen Murphy as Gypsy Girl
 Anthony Nicholls as Father Superior
 Joseph O'Conor as Pierre of St. Jean (as Joseph O'Connor)
 John Huston as Robert the Elder
 John Franklyn as Whoremaster
 Francis Heim as Knight Lieutenant
 Melvyn Hayes as First Entertainer
 Barry Keegan as Peasant Leader
 Nicholas Smith as Pilgrim
 Antoinette Reuss as Charcoal Woman
 Gilles Ségal as Entertainer 
 Med Hondo as Entertainer
 Luis Masson as Entertainer
 Eugen Ledebur as Goldsmith
 Otto Dworak as Innkeeper
 Max Sulz as Peasant
 John Veenenbos as Monk
 Dieter Tressler as Major Domo
 Paul Hör as Peasant Boy
 Myra Malik as Peasant Girl
 Michael Baronne as Soldier
 Yvan Strogoff as Soldier

Production
The film marked the screen debut of Huston's daughter Anjelica Huston. It also marked the screen debut of Israeli actor Assi Dayan, son of Moshe Dayan. John Huston plays the role of a noble who defects to the rebels.

Anjelica Huston had been in the running to play Juliet in director Franco Zeffirelli's adaptation of Romeo and Juliet, but John Huston withdrew her from consideration when he decided to cast her as Claudia in A Walk with Love and Death. Huston felt that she was wrong for the role, and has commented on the experience that her father "miscast me first time out and I think he realized that. I was ready to act, but I wasn't ready to act for him...I was difficult, I didn't want to act with no makeup, although I'd have done it for Franco." Father and daughter had a fractious relationship on set, with the young Anjelica's having difficulty learning her lines and focusing, and her father grew more impatient and angry at directing her.

Music
The musical score was the work of the French composer Georges Delerue. It incorporated medieval folk music themes, making extensive use of lute, harpsichord, and recorders.

Box office
The film was not a box-office success, but John Huston noted in his autobiography An Open Book (1980) that it was highly praised in France, where there was a greater understanding of the historical context.

According to Fox records, the film required $3,900,000 in rentals to break even and by 11 December 1970 had made $825,000. In September 1970 the studio reported it had lost $1,637,000 on the film.

Reception
Some contemporary reviewers considered that the film held up the past as a mirror of the events of 1968, when it was made. Comparisons were variously made with the Vietnam War or the Paris rioting of May/June that year, which required filming to be relocated to Austria and Italy. However a recent and detailed analysis of both novel and film by the essayist Peter G. Christensen concludes that the story is literally a period one, intended to evoke the turbulence of its 14th-century setting rather than illustrating cultural or generational issues of the late 1960s.

See also
 List of American films of 1969

References

External links
 
 
 
 
 A Walk with Love and Death review at The New York Times
 A Walk with Love and Death review at Time Out
 

1969 films
1969 romantic drama films
20th Century Fox films
American romantic drama films
American epic films
1960s English-language films
Films scored by Georges Delerue
Films based on American novels
Films directed by John Huston
Films set in France
Films set in the 14th century
Hundred Years' War films
1960s American films